Oru Rathri Oru Pakal (A night, a day) is a 2019 Indian Malayalam film written and directed by Prathap Joseph, His fourth film as a cinematographer-director, is set and filmed in Shoranur and stars Yamuna Chungappalli and Mari in the lead roles. It references of honour killing.

Festivals Participated
The film had its Indian premiere in Dec 2019 at the 3rd edition of the Kazhcha-Niv Independent Film Festival (KNIFF).

From KNIFF, the film travelled to the Kasargod International Film Festival. And then made it to the Open Screen. The film has also been selected in the Panchajanyam International Film festival, the International Film Festival of Trichur, the Independent Film Festival of Chennai, the Yashwant International Film festival, the Orange City International Film Festival, and the Independent Film Festival of Melbourne. 

Oru Rathri Oru Pakal and Dr. Biju's Veyilmarangal are the two Malayalam films nominated for the Pune International Film Festival.

References

External links
 
 Oru Rathri Oru Pakal at Kazhcha-Niv Independent Film Festival (KNIFF)
 Oru Rathri Oru Pakal at Thrissur International Film Festival (IFFT)
 Oru Rathri Oru Pakal at Independent Film Festival of Chennai (IFFC)
 Oru Rathri Oru Pakal at Yashwanth International Film Festival (YIFF)
 Oru Rathri Oru Pakal at Pune International Film Festival (PIFF)
 Oru Rathri Oru Pakal at Indian Film Festival of Melbourne

2019 films
Films set in Kerala
Films shot in Kozhikode
2010s Malayalam-language films
Films scored by Ouseppachan